Carlos Spadaro (5 February 1902 – 15 November 1985) was an Argentine football attacker.

References

External links

1902 births
1985 deaths
Argentine footballers
Argentine people of Italian descent
Argentina international footballers
1930 FIFA World Cup players
Association football forwards
Sportspeople from Lanús